Kolomeytsev or Kolomeitsev is a Russian masculine surname, its feminine counterpart is Kolomeytseva or Kolomeitseva. It may refer to
Aleksandr Kolomeytsev (born 1989), Russian football player
Nikolai Kolomeitsev (1867–1944), Russian Arctic explorer
Kolomeytsev Islands in the Kara Sea, named after Nikolai

Russian-language surnames